Classic Masters is the eight studio album by American saxophonist Ronnie Laws, released in 1984 by Capitol Records. The album reached No. 16 on the Billboard Traditional Jazz Albums chart and No. 33 on the Billboard Top Soul Albums chart.

Background
Artists such as Brad Buxer and Roland Bautista of Earth, Wind & Fire appeared on the album.

Singles
City Girl reached No. 31 on the Billboard Hot Soul Songs chart.

Tracklisting

References

1984 albums
Capitol Records albums
Ronnie Laws albums
Albums produced by Wayne Henderson (musician)